Wilfersdorf is a town in the district of Mistelbach in the Austrian state of Lower Austria.

Wifersdorf Castle is located in the town.

The first recorded reference was in 1514.

Population

References

Cities and towns in Mistelbach District